The House of Pluškoski family, or House of Pluškovci is a house in the village of Vevčani, Vevčani Municipality, Macedonia. The house belongs to the Pluškoski family and the building is registered as a Cultural Heritage of Macedonia.

Architecture 
The House of Pluškoski family is a house with a specifically divided chardak that runs through the house's outer space.

Gallery

See also
 House of Kostojčinoski family - a cultural heritage site
 House of Duckinoski family - a cultural heritage site
 House of Korunoski family - a cultural heritage site
 House of Ḱitanoski family - a cultural heritage site
 House of Pešinoski family - a cultural heritage site
 House of Kalajdžieski family - a cultural heritage site
 House of Gogoski family - a cultural heritage site
 House of Daskaloski family - a cultural heritage site
 House of Poposki family - a cultural heritage site
 Kostojčinoski fulling mill and gristmill - a cultural heritage site

References

External links 

Houses in Vevčani
Cultural heritage of North Macedonia